Metrobus is a public transport system owned by the city of St. John's, Newfoundland and Labrador, Canada. It operates a fleet of diesel buses. A total of 24 bus routes serve St. John's and its western suburbs of Mount Pearl and Paradise, carrying 2.9m passengers in 2016.

History
Metrobus Transit was established in 1958, and is operated by the St. John's Transportation Commission, a board consisting of six members and a chair, appointed by St John's City Council.

Metrobus Transit currently operates 24 routes. Routes travel around the cities of St. John's, Mount Pearl, and Paradise; and service major destinations including the Avalon Mall, Village Shopping Centre, Memorial University, Confederation Building, College of the North Atlantic, Marine Institute, Paradise Double Ice Complex arena, Shoppes at Galway, Mile One Centre, and downtown St. John's.

In recent years, Metrobus was plagued by two strikes in 2004 and 2010 respectively.  The first of those strikes lasted roughly two weeks, and wages were the key issue in that dispute; while the introduction of a 50/50 cost-sharing health benefit system was the key issue in the 2010 dispute.  The latter dispute lasted about three months, and was settled with a modest pay hike on January 27, 2011.

In 2006, Metrobus Transit upgraded its fare system to use a smart card system called the m-Card, which replaces tickets and monthly passes with a reloadable card and offers a points and rewards loyalty program.

In 2012, Metrobus Transit acquired nine new fully accessible Nova LFS Smart Buses and plan to purchase twenty-one additional buses by 2017. The Smart Bus technology on these buses can improve fuel economy by up to 18% and significantly reduce greenhouse gas emissions. From the outside, the new buses look very similar to the other low-floor buses already in its fleet, however, are fully accessible and include a wheelchair ramp and other related equipment. In 2017 St John's and the Federal government jointly funded 18 accessible replacement buses and 39 additional bus shelters.

In 2018, Metrobus introduced three brand-new Grande West Vicinity  buses, which are 10 ft shorter than the previous model purchased over the years to operate on smaller routes and offer a more fuel-efficient and quiet ride.

In July and August of 2022, Metrobus ran an advertisement that is deemed anti-semitic. Several attempts were made to explain to Metrobus' marketing office that this advertisement is inappropriate. Despite this, Metrobus deemed the advertisement "Accurate and Fair" and has allowed it to run.

Bus fleet
Metrobus Transit currently operates a fleet of 50         Nova LFS buses (0147-1630),

4 Grande West Vicinity buses (1831-2134) 

1 Chevrolet 4500 Arboc Spirit of freedom (Community Bus).

Routes 

Metrobus operates most routes year-round, with the exception of Routes 13, 24 and 26 not operating during the summer (late June - September) schedules. Primary and base routes usually operate at a 30-minute frequency on weekdays, with 60-minute frequency during the evenings and on weekends. Routes 1, 2, 3 and 10 operate at a 15-minute frequency during peak periods at between key points.

Route 28, also known as the Community Bus, is an accessible door to door route that connects select senior apartment complexes in the St. John's area with major shopping attractions.

Route 30 entered service on June 27, 2016, during the Metrobus summer schedule's period of operation, serving 55 new bus stops within the Town of Paradise.

Metrobus also offers an accessible door to door on demand service called GoBus which its operations is currently contracted out to MV Transportation.

References

External links
Metrobus Transit

Transit agencies in Newfoundland and Labrador
Transport in St. John's, Newfoundland and Labrador
Mount Pearl
Bus transport in Newfoundland and Labrador